Igor Anatolievich Chernykh (June 12, 1932 – July 15, 2020) was a Soviet cinematographer. He worked for Mosfilm. Chernykh was honored with Honored Artist of the RSFSR in 1988. He was best known for his works in The Diamond Arm, Particularly Important Task and Private Detective, or Operation Cooperation.

Chernykh graduated in 1955 from the cinematography department of the university of VGIK before joining Mosfilm as a director of photography. he went on to direct over 20 films and was noted to be one of the first to accomplish underwater photography.

Chernykh died on July 15, 2020, in Moscow, aged 88.

References

1932 births
2020 deaths
Soviet cinematographers
Deaths from the COVID-19 pandemic in Russia